Susanta is a given name. Notable people with the name include:

 Susanta Chakraborty (born 1940), Indian politician
 Susanta Ghosh, Indian politician
 Susanta Ghosh (politician), Indian politician
 Susanta Singh (born 1973), Indian politician

See also
 Susana (disambiguation)